Otfrid Mittmann (27 December 1908 in Ruda Śląska — 1998) was a German mathematician.
Starting in 1927, he studied mathematics and natural sciences in Göttingen and Leipzig, and got his Ph.D. in Apr 1935. He joined the Nazi movement in Oct 1929. and published on statistical aspects of Nazi eugenics. After the war, he published in Göttingen and Bonn.

Publications

References

20th-century German mathematicians
Nazi Party members
German eugenicists
1908 births
1998 deaths
People from Ruda Śląska